Phytoecia pubescens is a species of beetle in the family Cerambycidae. It was described by Maurice Pic in 1895, originally under the species Phytoecia manicata. It is known from Greece, Bulgaria, Croatia, Bosnia and Herzegovina, and Macedonia.

References

Phytoecia
Beetles described in 1895